The U.S. District Court for the Middle District of Georgia (in case citations, M.D. Ga.) is a United States district court which serves the residents of seventy counties from five divisions from its headquarters in Macon, Georgia.

Appeals from cases brought in the Middle District of Georgia are taken to the United States Court of Appeals for the Eleventh Circuit (except for patent claims and claims against the U.S. government under the Tucker Act, which are appealed to the Federal Circuit).

 the United States attorney is Peter D. Leary.

History 
The United States District Court for the District of Georgia was one of the original 13 courts established by the Judiciary Act of 1789, on September 24, 1789.

Jurisdiction 
The Albany division serves:  Baker, Ben Hill, Calhoun, Crisp, Decatur, Dougherty, Early, Grady, Lee, Miller, Mitchell, Schley, Seminole, Sumter, Terrell, Turner, Webster, and Worth counties.

The Athens division hears cases from:  Clarke, Elbert, Franklin, Greene, Hart, Madison, Morgan, Oconee, Oglethorpe, and Walton counties.

The Columbus division includes:  Chattahoochee, Clay, Harris, Marion, Muscogee, Quitman, Randolph, Stewart, Talbot, and Taylor counties.

The Macon division serves:  Baldwin, Bibb, Bleckley, Butts, Crawford, Dooly, Hancock, Houston, Jasper, Jones, Lamar, Macon, Monroe, Peach, Pulaski, Putnam, Twiggs, Upson, Washington, Wilcox and Wilkinson counties.

The Valdosta division hears cases for:  Berrien, Brooks, Clinch, Colquitt, Cook, Echols, Irwin, Lanier, Lowndes, Thomas, and Tift counties.

Current judges 
:

Former judges

Chief judges

Succession of seats

See also 
 Courts of Georgia
 List of current United States district judges
 List of United States federal courthouses in Georgia

References

External links 
 United States District Court for the Middle District of Georgia
 United States Attorney for the Middle District of Georgia

Georgia, Middle
Georgia (U.S. state) law
Macon, Georgia
Albany, Georgia
Columbus, Georgia
Thomas County, Georgia
Valdosta, Georgia
1926 establishments in Georgia (U.S. state)
Courts and tribunals established in 1926